Diego Guijarro Alvarez, known professionally as Diego Guijarro, is a Spanish-Canadian cinematographer. He is most noted for his work on the 2021 film Carmen, for which he won the Borsos Competition award for Best Cinematography in a Canadian film at the 2021 Whistler Film Festival.

A native of Madrid, Guijarro moved to Canada at age 19 to study English. Deciding to stay in Canada, he studied cinematography at Sheridan College, and won the Canadian Society of Cinematographers award for Best Student Cinematography in 2016 for his fourth-year student film House of Glory.

His other credits have included the film Islands, and music videos for Lydia Ainsworth, Nikki Yanofsky and Begonia.

References

External links

Canadian cinematographers
Spanish cinematographers
People from Madrid
Sheridan College alumni
Spanish emigrants to Canada
Living people
Year of birth missing (living people)